Zaiser is a surname. Notable people with the surname include:

Lisa Zaiser (born 1994), Austrian swimmer
Maximilian Zaiser (born 1999), German footballer
Steve Zaiser (born 1951), American politician
Wilton Zaiser, American drag racer

See also
Gaiser
Zaisser
Zaiter